The Town of Masoudieh is a neighborhood located in the 15th municipal district of Tehran.

Population 
In 2011, Masoudieh had a population of 74,500 people.

Note 

Neighbourhoods in Tehran